The third season of 90210, an American television series, premiered on Monday September 13, 2010. The CW officially renewed the show for a third season on February 16, 2010. With the reveal of the networks fall 2010 schedule, they announced their decision to move 90210 to Monday nights at 8:00 pm, as a lead-in to Gossip Girl. It premiered on September 13, 2010 and was met with generally positive reviews from critics.

The season picks up at the start of the main character's shaky start to senior year of high school as Beverly Hills is rocked by an earthquake. Naomi has spent the summer dealing with the aftermath of her rape by Mr. Cannon. Annie and Dixon are dealing with the absence of their father while Debbie tries to hold the family together. Teddy and Silver find themselves happier than ever until he suffers an injury that could end his tennis career., and a night of drinking leads him to discover a part of himself that he didn't know was there. Adriana's get her rise to stardom, but soon people around her, including Navid find out that it is built on lies and blackmail. Navid discovers  a secret about his family that might tear them apart.  While two couples prepare to leave for Splitsville, two more pair up. It may be their final year of high school, but with this group of friends, they will go out on top!
The season premiered to 1.96 million viewers and a 0.9 rating in the adults 18–49 demographic. Christmas-themed episode "Holiday Madness", hit season highs in all key demos with 2.1 in The CW's target demo of women 18–34, a 1.4 in adults 18–34 and a 1.1 in adults 18–49. It was also the most watched episode in over a year with 2.2 million viewers tuning in. The season finale aired on May 16, 2011. The season averaged 1.75 million live viewers and a 0.9 adults 18–49 rating. It was released on DVD in the United States on August 30, 2011.

Cast

Regular
 Shenae Grimes as Annie Wilson (22 episodes)
 Tristan Wilds as Dixon Wilson (22 episodes)
 AnnaLynne McCord as Naomi Clark (22 episodes)
 Ryan Eggold as Ryan Matthews (11 episodes)
 Jessica Stroup as Erin Silver (22 episodes)
 Michael Steger as Navid Shirazi (20 episodes)
 Jessica Lowndes as Adrianna Tate-Duncan (22 episodes)
 Matt Lanter as Liam Court (22 episodes)
 Gillian Zinser as Ivy Sullivan (21 episodes)
 Trevor Donovan as Teddy Montgomery (18 episodes)
 Lori Loughlin as Debbie Wilson (15 episodes)

Recurring
 Blair Redford as Oscar (10 episodes)
 Evan Ross as Charlie Selby (9 episodes)
 Kelly Lynch as Laurel Cooper (9 episodes)
 Kyle Riabko as Ian (9 episodes)
 Josh Zuckerman as Max Miller (8 episodes)
 Manish Dayal as Raj Kher (7 episodes)
 Nestor Serrano as Victor Luna (7 episodes)
 Hal Ozsan as Miles Cannon (7 episodes)
 Abbie Cobb as Emily Bradford (6 episodes)
 Freddie Smith as Marco Salazar (5 episodes)
 Sara Foster as Jennifer "Jen" Clark (5 episodes)
 Amelia Rose Blaire as Laura Mathison (4 episodes)
 Diego Boneta as Javier Luna (2 episodes)
 Amanda Leighton as Alex Scarborough (2 episodes)

Special Guest Stars
 Kim Kardashian as herself (1 episode)
 Khloe Kardashian as herself (1 episode)
 Joe Jonas as himself (1 episode)
 Nelly as himself (1 episode)
 Snoop Dogg as himself (1 episode)

Episodes

<onlyinclude>{{Episode table
|background=#45A6AC
|overall=
|season=
|title=
|director=
|writer=
|airdate=
|viewers=
|country=U.S.
|episodes=

{{Episode list/sublist|90210 (season 3)
|EpisodeNumber=48
|EpisodeNumber2=2
|Title= Age of Inheritance
|DirectedBy= Liz Friedlander
|WrittenBy= Padma L. Atluri
|Viewers=1.83
|OriginalAirDate=
|ShortSummary= After turning 18, Naomi finds out she can now access the money in her large trust fund, so she decides to throw herself a huge birthday party at the Beach Club where she hires the Honey Brothers band to perform. Meanwhile, Dixon, Navid, and Teddy decide to take Oscar out for a night on the town, but their party cuts short when ivy finds out via a Facebook post that Dixon did a body shot off of a girl and Silver finds out that Teddy was still drinking, resulting in them breaking up. Annie has an instant connection with Charlie, a guy she meets at a coffee shop. Jen is forced to go on bed rest until she delivers the baby and has no choice but to allow Ryan into her life. Elsewhere, Adrianna uses Javier's song book to get back in good favor with the label. Entourage'''s Adrian Grenier performs with his band at Naomi's birthday party.
|LineColor=45A6AC
}}

}}</onlyinclude>

Production
The CW officially renewed 90210 for a third season on February 16, 2010. On May 20, 2010 the network announced its decision to move 90210 to Monday nights at 8:00 pm Eastern/7:00 pm Central, as a lead-in to Gossip Girl. Together, 90210 and Gossip Girl have the highest concentration of women 18–34 on network television, said The CW. The series is produced by CBS Television Studios, with Rebecca Sinclair as executive producer.

The season premiered on September 13, 2010. The series returned from its midseason break on January 24, 2011, with the season finale airing on May 16, 2011.

Storylines

The third season of 90210 welcomed the students of West Beverly Hills High School to their senior year with a surprising new family and the destruction of another. Adrianna's pop career blossomed and a new love will caused the fall out of a group of friends. An earthquake hit Beverly Hills in the premiere. "We wanted to open the season with an event that has both physical and emotional ramifications for several people," said co-executive producer Jennie Snyder Urman, who added that the tremors would prove particularly life-altering for one teen. "One of them has a very serious injury that takes time to resolve and sort of changes the direction of his or her life." It was revealed during the summer of 2010 that either Liam, Navid, or Teddy would come out as gay in season 3. Co-executive producer, Jennie Urman said of that matter, "We want to address the issue in a real and relatable way." The character was later revealed as Teddy. Silver's bi-polar disorder was revisited after Adrianna tampered with her medication when implementing a plot for revenge. In Season 3, Adrianna also sees a boom in her entertainment career as an aspiring reality TV star, though is eventually driven to desperate ends to keep her show alive, such as the pronouncement that she will be seeking to regain the daughter she once gave up for adoption. TVLine revealed that a major character would find out that she was pregnant in the finale. It was later revealed that Naomi was the character in question. 

Cast

On February 25, 2010, Gillian Zinser, who plays Ivy Sullivan, was promoted to series regular for the third season. On May 20, 2010, with the reveal of The CW's fall schedule, the series regulars for the third season were announced. Shenae Grimes, Tristan Wilds, AnnaLynne McCord, Ryan Eggold, Jessica Stroup, Michael Steger, Jessica Lowndes, Matt Lanter and Lori Loughlin were all announced to be continuing their roles on the show. It was also announced that Trevor Donovan, who plays Teddy Montgomery, was upgraded to series regular.

In January 2010, it was confirmed that Jennie Garth would be leaving 90210 to focus more on her writing. Two days later it was announced that series lead, Rob Estes would also be departing the series. Failure to reach an agreement in contract negotiations have been cited as a factor in Estes' departure, though, he apparently leaves on good terms with the producers and the network. The producers said they were willing to let them go as they are "trying to establish a separate identity for the new show," and want to focus on the younger cast members and not those who starred Beverly Hills, 90210 and Melrose Place. A representative for 90210 told E! Online, "This is Rob's last season on 90210. He's a talented actor and we couldn't have asked for a better Harry Wilson." The actor also released a statement regarding his exit saying, "This is my final season on 90210 and I wish the show, cast and crew nothing but the best. I am looking forward to spending time with my kids and exploring other opportunities."

On June 29, 2010, it was announced that Kim Kardashian, Kourtney Kardashian and Khloé Kardashian would guest-star in the season premiere as themselves. However, it was later revealed that just Kim and Khloe had filmed scenes. Adrian Grenier appeared in one episode with his band at Naomi's 18th birthday party. Entertainment Weekly Blair Redford was cast in a recurring role as a character named Oscar. They revealed he would move in with Ivy and her mother. Evan Ross joined the cast as Charlie, an older newcomer who gets tangled up in a love triangle with two main cast members. Zap2It reported that Mekia Cox would reprise her role as Sasha in the October 3 episode. Kyle Riabko was cast as Ian, a love interest of Teddy. Joe Jonas guest starred in the eighth episode of the season, escorting Adrianna on a red carpet event.

Abbie Cobb began a recurring role in January 2011. She portrayed Annie and Dixon's cousin, Emily, who came to Beverly Hills with the purpose of stealing everything and everybody in Annie's life. Claudia Black joined the cast as Guru Sona, a yoga teacher who Naomi comes to rely on when she meets the characters at a retreat. On December 1, 2010, Movieline announced that rapper Nelly would play himself in an episode of the show in 2011. They revealed the storyline would focus on Dixon (Tristan Wilds) and Navid (Michael Steger) getting involved in the video shoot for Nelly's song 'She's So Fly'. Kyle Riabko left the series to make himself available for the pilot season. Freddie Smith replaced Riabko as Teddy's new love interest, Marco. He was described as "hot", "super-athletic" and openly gay. Snoop Dogg made a cameo appearance as himself in the later half of the season when he ran into Dixon at a carwash. Alan Ritchson guest starred in the seasons eighteenth episode as a former prep-school roommate of Teddy's, who hooks up with him. Oscar nominee, Sally Kellerman appeared in a multi-episode arc as Marla, a former movie star who is suffering from dementia and has become a hoarder. Marla hired Annie to help her clean out her house. Manish Dayal was cast in a recurring role as Raj, who became involved in Ivy's life. Josh Zuckerman was cast in a recurring role as Max Miller, a nerdy student and Naomi's lab partner whom Naomi develops feelings for.

 Reception 

The season premiere was watched by 1.96 million live viewers in the United States and achieved a 0.9 rating in the adults 18–49 demographic, up 22.5% in viewers and 12.5% in demo from the season two finale. Episode 11 achieved season highs in all key demos with a 1.1 adults 18–49 rating, a 1.4 in adults 18–34 and a 2.1 rating in The CW's target demographic of women 18–34. It was also the most watched episode since October, 2009 with 2.18 million viewers tuning in. Episode 15 hit series lows in women 18–34 with a 1.0 rating and matched series lows in adults 18–49 with a 0.7 rating. The season finale scored a 0.8 rating in adults 18–49, which was lifted to a 1.2 rating with a full week of DVR viewing taken into account. The season averaged 1.75 million viewers and a 0.9 rating in adults 18–49. With live+7 day DVR viewing taken into account, it averaged 2.26 million viewers and a 1.2 rating. In the UK episode eight was seen by 548,000 viewers, which was higher than the pilot episode "We're Not in Kansas Anymore". "Best Lei'd Plans" continued upwards with 604,000 viewers becoming the No. 2 rated show on E4 that week.

Critical reception for the season was mostly positive. TVfanatic.com rated the season premiere 3.7 out of 5 and said, "The series started from scratch in a lot of ways, manufacturing brand new developments that added to 90210's fluidity problem, yet may prove to be promising if the drama can actually stick with certain developments and see them through." Mark Estes of TVOverMind'' said "The West Beverly kids are back and is it just me or did they NOT disappoint tonight?" His review of the second episode was also positive stating, "Two in a row? 90210 is really coming back strong this year as tonight's episode introduced new people, new plot lines, and the makings of a villain in the increasingly slimy Oscar."

DVD release
The DVD release of season three was released after the season has completed broadcast on television. It has been released in Regions 1, 2 and 4. As well as every episode from the season, the DVD release features bonus material such as deleted scenes, gag reels and behind-the-scenes featurettes.

References

2010 American television seasons
2011 American television seasons